Sani Rizki Fauzi (born 7 January 1998) is an Indonesian professional footballer who plays as a winger or full-back for Liga 1 club Bhayangkara and the Indonesia national team.

Club career

Bhayangkara FC
He was signed for Bhayangkara to play in Liga 1 in 2018. Sani made his first-team debut on 23 March 2018 in a 0–0 draw against Persija Jakarta. On 3 August 2018, Sani Rizki scored his first goal for Bhayangkara against PSMS Medan in the 4th minute at the PTIK Stadium, Jakarta.

International career
In January 2022, Sani was called up to the senior team in a friendly match in Bali by Shin Tae-yong. He earned his first cap in a 4–1 win friendly match against Timor Leste on 27 January 2022.

Personal life
Sani's father is Edi Riadi and his mother is Ida Kusumawati. He is a First Police Brigadier in the Indonesian National Police.

Career statistics

Club

International

International goals
International under-23 goals

Honours

International 
Indonesia U-23
 AFF U-22 Youth Championship: 2019
 Southeast Asian Games  Silver medal: 2019

References

External links

1998 births
Living people
People from Sukabumi
Sportspeople from West Java
Liga 1 (Indonesia) players
Bhayangkara F.C. players
Association football midfielders
Indonesia youth international footballers
Indonesia international footballers
Indonesian footballers
Competitors at the 2019 Southeast Asian Games
Southeast Asian Games silver medalists for Indonesia
Southeast Asian Games medalists in football